is a Japanese actress, model and TV personality who has had a number of supporting roles in films and television dramas.

Biography
Saeko was born on November 16, 1986, in Miyazaki, Miyazaki. She is a graduate of Horikoshi High School a private high school in Nakano, Tokyo, famous for being attended by many Japanese celebrities.

She co-hosted and performed a cover song at the annual Girl Pop Factory show in the summer of 2004.

On November 11, 2007, she married Yu Darvish. The two chose the 11/11 date, because 11 was husband Yu’s number. They had their formal wedding in Hawaii in January 2008. They have two sons, but were divorced in 2012.

Filmography

Television dramas
 Natsu no Hikari (2004)
 Tenka (2004), Yuka Satō
 Aijo Ippon (Judo Kids "Ippon!") (2004), Mirin Shibata
 Be Bop High School 2 (2005), Maki
 Dragon Zakura (2005), Maki Kobayashi
 Konya Hitori no Beddo de (2005), Maiko Terao
 Oishii Proposal (2006), Michiru Asakura
 Drama Complex (2006)
 Nodame Cantabile (2006), Sakura Saku
 Takusan no Ai o Arigato (2006)
 Honto ni Atta Kowai Hanashi Soko ni Iru! (2006), Sayaka Nagamori
 Saigo no Nightingale (2006), Etsuko Nakane
 The Hit Parade (TV Fuji movie) (2006)
 Good Job (2007), Tomomi Nioka
 Hotelier (2007), Akane Morimoto
 Marumaru Chibi Maruko-chan (2007), Tama-chan
 Cho Saigen! Mystery (2012), as herself - Emcee
 5-ji Kara 9-ji Made: Watashi ni Koi Shita Obōsan (2015), Masako Mōri

Film
 Fune o Oritara Kanojo no Shima (Her Island, My Island) (2003), Tsuru-hime
 One Missed Call (2004), schoolgirl
 Zoo Seven Rooms (2005), Mari
 Nana (2005), Sachiko Kawamura
 Lovehotels (2006), Ai Urasaka
 Backdancers! (2006), Aiko
 Sugar & Spice - Fūmi Zekka (2006), Sae
 Like a Dragon (2007), Yui
 Closed Note (2007), Hana Ikeuchi
 Gachi Boy (Wrestling with a Memory) (2008), Asako Asaoka

Photobooks
 Episode 1 (Takarajimasha, 24 December 2013),

References

External links
  
 Official blog 
 
 Talent data bank interview 

1986 births
Japanese female models
Japanese film actresses
Japanese television actresses
Japanese television personalities
Japanese idols
Living people
Horikoshi High School alumni
21st-century Japanese actresses